The George McManus House is a private house located at 121 State Street in Petoskey, Michigan. It was placed on the National Register of Historic Places in 1986.

The George McManus House is a -story Colonial Revival house with a hipped roof and a single-story addition in the rear. Each side of the roof has gabled dormers containing Palladian window units. The building is sheathed in clapboard, and has corner pilasters and a cornice on top. The front facade has an entry porch with Ionic columns. The windows have multiple vertical panes with a single-pane light on top.

The George McManus House was constructed c. 1910 for Geaorge McManus, the President of the Petoskey Garage and Sales Company, and of W.L. McManus Lumber Company. The house marries the basic Colonial Revival design with elements from the Prairie School.

References

Houses on the National Register of Historic Places in Michigan
Colonial Revival architecture in Michigan
Prairie School architecture
Emmet County, Michigan